Zoomarine is an amusement park located in Central and Southern Italy. Inaugurated in September 2005, it is owned by Dolphin Discovery from August 2015.

History
The structure takes up the concept and philosophy of the homonymous structure located in Portugal since 1989. The owners, the Mundo Aquatico- Parques de Oceanográficos Educational Entretenimento SA, then decided to realize the same structure in Italy. From August 1 2015, the park is owned by the Mexican multinational Dolphin Discovery.

References

External links
 

Animal theme parks
Amusement parks in Italy
2005 establishments in Italy
Amusement parks opened in 2005